Yagshygeldi Ilyasovich Kakayev (1959–8 July 2020) was a Turkmen politician and energy executive. He was a Deputy Chairman of the Cabinet of Ministers of Turkmenistan from 2012 to 2013 and from 2015 to 2017. In 2010, he served as acting Deputy Chairman. His career in government was primarily focused on oil and gas matters. From 2007 to 2016, he was the Director of the State Agency for Management of Hydrocarbons.

Biography
He was born in Görogly District, Dashoguz province in 1959, and in 1982 he graduated from the Turkmen Polytechnic Institute with a concentration in oil and gas exploration and mechanization.  In his early career, he worked with the All-Russian Research Institute for Gas and later became head of the institute's department of oil and gas.

From 2007 to 2008, he was the chairman of Türkmengaz, the state owned natural gas company. In 2010, he took over the role of Deputy Chairman of the Cabinet of Ministers on an acting basis from Baymurat Hojamuhammedov, who had been dismissed by President Gurbanguly Berdimuhamedow for "unsatisfactory performance".

In 2012, Kakayev was appointed director of the (now defunct) State Agency for Management and Utilization of Hydrocarbon Resources.

Kakayev served twice more as the Deputy Chairman on a full-time basis.  In 2017, he was dismissed by the president from this post because of weak control over the implementation of the country's oil and gas strategy.

From 22 December 2017 until his death, he was an advisor to the President of Turkmenistan for oil and gas affairs.  In February 2020 he was given a "stern reprimand with final warning" for allegedly poor performance.

Kakayev reportedly died from pneumonia on 8 July 2020. He had also reportedly suffered from diabetes. One opposition media source stated, however, that Kakayev died of COVID-19.

Legacy
On 12 February 2021, the Turkmen Mejlis (parliament) decreed, at the request of President Berdimuhamedow, that the International Oil and Gas University be named in honor of Kakayev.

References

1959 births
2020 deaths
Government ministers of Turkmenistan
People from Daşoguz Region